Kellick Island is an island  long, lying  north-east of Round Point, off the north coast of King George Island in the South Shetland Islands of Antarctica. It was named by the UK Antarctic Place-Names Committee in 1960 for Captain Kellick, Master of the British sealer Henry, who visited the South Shetland Islands in 1821–22.

Important Bird Area
The island has been identified as an Important Bird Area (IBA) by BirdLife International because it supports a large breeding colony of about 27,000 pairs of chinstrap penguins.

See also 
 List of Antarctic and Subantarctic islands

References

Islands of King George Island (South Shetland Islands)
Important Bird Areas of Antarctica
Penguin colonies